The Florida Complex League Mets are a Rookie-level affiliate for the New York Mets, competing in the Florida Complex League of Minor League Baseball. Prior to 2021, the team was known as the Gulf Coast League Mets. The team plays its home games at Clover Park in Port St. Lucie, Florida. The team is composed mainly of players who are in their first year of professional baseball either as draftees or non-drafted free agents from the United States, Canada, Dominican Republic, Venezuela, and other countries.

History
The team entered the Gulf Coast League (GCL) in 1983, was absent for four seasons, then returned to the league for the 1988–1999 seasons. After again being absent for four seasons, the team returned to the league for the 2004–2011 seasons. On December 20, 2011, it was announced the Mets would eliminate their Rookie level team due to financial reasons.

The team originally played their home games in Sarasota, Florida, at Twin Lakes Park. In 1992, the team moved their base of operations to Port St. Lucie, Florida, when the league expanded to Florida's east coast.

On November 8, 2012, the Mets announced the re-establishment of a Gulf Coast League team based in Port St. Lucie. The team has competed continuously since the 2013 season, except for the 2020 season, which was cancelled due to the COVID-19 pandemic. Prior to the 2021 season, the Gulf Coast League was renamed as the Florida Complex League (FCL).

Season-by-season record

Roster

References

External links
 Official website

Baseball teams established in 1983
Professional baseball teams in Florida
Port St. Lucie, Florida
Gul
1983 establishments in Florida